

List of the National Register of Historic Places listings in Chenango County, New York

This is intended to be a complete list of properties and districts listed on the National Register of Historic Places in Chenango County, New York.  The locations of National Register properties and districts for which the latitude and longitude coordinates are included below, may be seen in a map.



Current listings

|}

See also

National Register of Historic Places listings in New York

References

External links

A useful list of the above sites, with street addresses and other information, is available at Chenango County, New York, listing, at National Register of Historic Places.Com, a private site serving up public domain information on NRHPs.

Chenango County